KZ Sport 1 TV channel — the first Kazakhstan sports TV channel which broadcasts 7 days in a week, 24 hours per day. The TV channel has private form of ownership.

KZ Sport 1 — it:

 100% Kazakhstan channel
 100% independent channel
 100% self-supporting channel
 100% available channel

TV channel History 
 on November 17, 2008 — TV channel it was registered;
 on December 12, 2008 — in the capital of the Republic of Kazakhstan, in the city of Astana there passed TV channel presentation. As the leader sports commentator Gusev Victor Mikhaylovich was invited. The red tape was cut by the chairman of Committee on sports of the Ministry of tourism and sports of the Republic of Kazakhstan Kulnazarov Anatoly Kozhekenovich and the general director of KZ Sport TV channel 1 Lydia Kachelayeva;
 on November 16, 2012 — TV channel rebranding: logo replacement.

Old logo of the Kazakhstan sports TV channel KZ Sport 1.

TV channel Tasks 
 Sports promoting in the Republic of Kazakhstan, by translation of the Kazakhstan sporting events, and also sports events of world level;
 Translation of sporting events with participation of domestic athletes abroad;
 Involvement of citizens of the Republic of Kazakhstan to a healthy lifestyle;
 Development of mass sports among citizens of the Republic of Kazakhstan;
 Attraction of interest to child youthful sports from the state;
 Attraction of interest to the sports organizations developing sports for people with limited physical and intellectual possibilities;
 Production of own telecasts with participation of stars of sports;
 Integration into world cultural process and global information space;
 Interaction with the domestic, foreign and international companies and advertising agencies on a commercial basis: advertising, sponsorship of translations and sports events.

Owners and management 
General director — Lydia Kachelayeva

Broadcasting 

 The satellite broadcasting  was carried out till July, 2012 by means of translation via the satellite "Yamal 201" at cooperation with the operator of services of satellite communication of Zharyk LLP.
 The cable broadcasting  is carried out through a cable network "Alma TV".
 On-air broadcasting is carried out through a network of digital radio telecasting "OTAU TV", belonging to the national operator of radio and satellite TV and radio broadcasting of the Republic of Kazakhstan of joint stock company "Kazteleradio".

Translation

Transfers 

The "All-terrain vehicle" serialized television program (Broadcast time on KZ Sport 1 TV channel: Environment 20:00, Friday 14:00)

Body the Vezdekhod magazine shines not only off-road sports, but also all variety of that isn't connected with a routine tide of life. An extreme, in all the variety, active, sometimes very, types of the rest, unusual autotravel to the unusual countries, raids with okhoto-and a rybinspektsiya, participation of "off-road" activists in the solution of environmental problems of the republic, activity of "asphalt" cars of fan clubs, acquaintance of the viewer to persons very authoritative in this sphere of human life, and also with equipment and the equipment, intended for all above-mentioned.

Partners 
KZ Sport 1 TV channel, cooperates with such media holdings, as «Sport Five», «ASN», «IEC in Sports», «Orange», «AMI», «UFO Sport», "KHL-marketing", «Team Marketing», «IMG», «NTV +».

Development prospects 

 Creation of an official site www.kzsport1.kz;
 The on-line Organization of translation of TV channel on a site www.kzsport1.kz;
 Transition to a broadcasting in a HD format;
 The beginning of a broadcasting of TV channel by means of a mobile network 4G;
 KZ Sport 2 TV channel Creation.

References 
 Official site of KZ Sport 1 TV channel;
 Official Twitter KZ Sport 1 TV channel account;

External links

Television stations in Kazakhstan
Sports television networks